Tall Timbers is an unincorporated community and census-designated place in St. Mary's County, Maryland, United States.

Demographics

References

Census-designated places in St. Mary's County, Maryland
Census-designated places in Maryland